Frank Couzens (February 28, 1902 – October 31, 1950) was the son of United States Senator James J. Couzens, and mayor of Detroit, Michigan during the 1930s.

Early life
Frank Couzens was born in Detroit on February 28, 1902, the son of businessman (and later mayor of Detroit and United States Senator) James J. Couzens.  He went to Newman Preparatory School in New Jersey, then returned to Detroit to attend high school. After graduation, he worked as an apprentice in the building trades, then as an inspector for an architectural firm.  In 1922, he formed his own building contractor firm.

Frank Couzens married Margaret Lang in 1922; the couple had four sons: Frank Couzens Jr., James Couzens II, Homer J. Couzens, and George L. Couzens; and three daughters: Mrs. Edward C. Roney, Mary Elizabeth Couzens, and Barbara Ann Couzens.

Politics
In 1928, then-mayor John C. Lodge appointed Couzens a member of the Detroit Street Railways Commission.  He was fired by the next mayor, Charles Bowles, in 1930 after opposing Bowles's effort to raise the streetcar fare.  However, the deeply unpopular Bowles was recalled from office, and Frank Murphy reinstated Couzens.

In 1931, Couzens ran for a seat on the Detroit City Council, and garnered enough votes to become council president.  When Murphy resigned in 1933 to become governor of the Philippines, Couzens became acting mayor.  He resigned the mayor's office on September 8, 1933, to concentrate on receiving the Republican nomination for the office.  He was elected mayor twice, filling out four years in office.

Later life
After stepping down from the mayor's office, Couzens retired from politics and founded the Wabeek Bank of Detroit, whose chairman he remained for the next 12 years.  He died after a long battle with cancer on October 31, 1950. Wabeek Bank would after a series of mergers become part of Comerica.

References

External links

1902 births
1950 deaths
Mayors of Detroit
Detroit City Council members
Michigan Republicans
20th-century American politicians
American people of Canadian descent